Laluksola Borphukan (fl. 1672–1680) Laluk Nimati Phukan elder brother of Lachit Borphukan succeed the seat of Borphukan after demise of his younger brother Lachit Phukan, Laluksola Borphukan, who abandoned Guwahati, and aspired to be a king.  He was appointed the Borphukan by Udayaditya Singha after the death of his younger brother and predecessor, Lachit Borphukan, in 1672.  He was assassinated by his servent while he was at sleep.

Notes

References

 

People of the Ahom kingdom
Ahom kingdom